The 2018 Pro Mazda Championship was the 20th season in series history. It was the final season using the Pro Mazda name, as the series was re-branded as "Indy Pro 2000" for the 2019 season. A 16-race schedule was announced on 17 October 2017. This was the first season to use the new Tatuus PM-18 chassis and Mazda MZR piston engine. All prior engine packages for the series included a Mazda Wankel engine.

Drivers and teams

Schedule

Race results

Championship standings

Drivers' Championship
Scoring system

 The driver who qualifies on pole is awarded one additional point.
 One point is awarded to the driver who leads the most laps in a race.
 One point is awarded to the driver who sets the fastest lap during the race.

Teams' championship
Scoring system

Single car teams receive 3 bonus points as an equivalency to multi-car teams

Only the best two results count for teams fielding more than two entries

See also
2018 IndyCar Series
2018 Indy Lights
2018 U.S. F2000 National Championship

References

External links
 

Pro Mazda Championship
Indy Pro 2000 Championship